Cowanesque may refer to:

Cowanesque, Pennsylvania, a community in Tioga County
Cowanesque Lake, a US Army Corps of Engineers flood prevention lake in Pennsylvania
Cowanesque River, a tributary of the Tioga River in Pennsylvania and New York
Cowanesque Rock, an island of Alaska
Cowanesque Valley Railroad
Corning, Cowanesque and Antrim Railway
USS Cowanesque (AO-79), originally named the SS Fort Duquesne, a type T2 tanker